Anhui Jianghuai Automobile (JAC) is a Chinese car and commercial truck-maker.

JAC Motors

JAC J2
JAC J3
JAC J5
JAC J6
JAC T40
JAC T6

Heyue

A series of models of JAC that produces sedans and hatchbacks.
Heyue sedan- also known as J5 or B15 (1.5 and 1.8 litre)
Heyue A30 (1.5 litre)- also known as J3 Tongyuesedan (aka "J3 Turin"), (the production of the electric vehicle version has started). hatchback (aka "J3")
Heyue A13
Yueyue- also known as J2 (1.0 litre) (HFC 7100W and HFC 7100WT) (now called J2) AKA Yueyue supermini

Refine

A sub-brand of JAC that produces passenger vehicles mainly MPVs and CUVs.
Refine M6
Refine M5 (Refine II, M2) (2.0 litre) - restyled in 2004 (Refine Gold, Refine II)
Refine M4
Refine M3
Refine M2- Previously the Heyue RS or J6 (1.5 and 1.8 litre) 
Refine M1 (2.0, 2.4 and 2.8 litre) (Discontinued)
Refine S7 (1.5, 2.0 turbo)
Refine S5 (2.0litre turbo),(1.5, 2.0,2.5 litre) 2015
Refine S3 (1.5  1.6 litre) 2017
Refine S2 (1.5 litre) 2015
Refine S2 Mini- crossover based on the Heyue Yueyue
Refine R3
Refine A60

JAC iEV

A sub-brand of JAC that produces electric vehicles and new energy vehicles.
iEV4- Electric sedan based on the Heyue A13
iEV6E- Electric hatchback based on the Heyue Yueyue
iEV7- Electric sedan based on the Heyue A30
iEV7S- Electric crossover based on the Refine S2
iEVA50- Electric sedan based on the Heyue sedan

Light trucks and pickups
Shuailing
Shuailing H series
Shuailing W series 
Shuailing K series
Shuailing X series
Shuailing T6 Pickup 
Shuailing i series
Shuailing G series
Junling
Junling E series
Junling V series
Junling G series
HY()
K series
H series
X series
G series
HFC1020KW1
HFC1027K1R
4R3 
HFC1020K
HFC1040K/KR1, HFC1040K
HFC1045
HFC1048
HFC1061
HFC1063
HFC1083
HFC3045K

SRV
Rein (Ruiying)

Special-purpose vehicles
Ambulance
Mail Car
Mobile Food Wagon
Overhead Working Vehicle
PepsiCo Bar Cart
Police Wagon
Refrigerated Light Truck
Road-block Removal Truck
Stage Vehicle
Tank Truck
Traffic Control Vehicle
Wingspan Van
HFC1083
HFC3045K
HFC3072KR1
HFC1131KR1
HFC5250GJBL

Commercial vehicles

Half Height Roof Cab (tilt cab) (HFC 4131KR1/HFC 4183K3R1/HFC 4181KR1K3)
Dump truck (tilt cab) (HFC 3251KR1/HFC 3251KR1)
Concrete mixer (tilt cab) (HFC 5250GJBL/HFC 5255GJBLK3/HFC 5310GJBL)
Large commercial flatbed truck (tilt cab) (HFC 1131KR1/HFC 1131KR1/HFC 1131KR1)
HFC 1132 Runner - based on Scania R-series truck cab

Bus chassis
HFC6100KY
HFC6700K6C
HFC6700K3Y
HFC6782KYZL2
HFC6832KYZL1
HFC6700KY6C

Concept Cars
S11 (Hybrid Sports car)

References

Automotive industry in China
JAC Motors